Hiran Magri is a locality in the Udaipur city of Rajasthan state. This is one of the largest residential colony group in the city.

History
Udaipur was one time surrounded by the City Wall of Udaipur, called in Hindi Parkota. Surajpole (Udaipur), Hathipole, Udiapole, Chandpole, DelhiGate, were the key entrant to the city. In late 80s when population of the city started growing, and people felt need for more residential colonies, they started moving towards the southern suburban area, on the opposite side of Udaipur City Railway Station. This suburban region is now known as Hiran Magri.

General
Hiran Margi is the wide colonial area situated towards the southern side of the city center. It is around 4.0 km from the Udaipur City railway station. It is divided into a smaller sections, which are sequentially numbered as "sectors". Hiran Margi was originally developed as a residential area, but gradually it saw development of multiple smaller sized commercial markets, and at present, it provides almost equal size of commercial market value as the main Udaipur city.

See also
Udaipur
Surajpole
Chandpole
Udiapole

References

Areas of Udaipur